Walden is an unincorporated community in Bibb County, Georgia, United States.  It is part of the Macon Metropolitan Statistical Area.

History
A post office called Walden was established in 1878, and remained in operation until 1954. The name may be borrowed from Walden is a book by Henry David Thoreau.

References

Unincorporated communities in Georgia (U.S. state)
Unincorporated communities in Bibb County, Georgia
Macon metropolitan area, Georgia